The International Day for Tolerance is an annual observance day declared by UNESCO in 1995 to generate public awareness of the dangers of intolerance. It is observed on 16 November.

Conferences and festivals
Every year various conferences and festivals are organized in the occasion of International Day for Tolerance. Among them, "Universal Tolerance Cartoon Festival" in Drammen, Norway which organized an International Cartoon Festival in 2013.

The day is observed in Bangladesh with Peace Summit. Peace Summit is organized by Preneur Lab and the EMK Center. The conference is a platform to talk and share on country’s challenges on issues like peace, tolerance, fake news, online safety and hate.

See also
Human rights education
Toleration
UNESCO-Madanjeet Singh Prize for the promotion of tolerance and non-violence. The winner of this bi-annual award established in 1996 is announced on the International Day for Tolerance.
United Nations Year for Tolerance
List of international days
World Conference against Racism

References

External links
 International Day for Tolerance
 Declaration of the Principles of Tolerance

November observances
Recurring events established in 1995
Tolerance, International Day for